Saint-Pardoux-Corbier (Limousin: Sent Pardos Corbier) is a commune in the Corrèze department in central France.

Population

See also
Communes of the Corrèze department

References

Communes of Corrèze